The Vintage Base Ball Association is a vintage base ball league founded in 1996 in Columbus, Ohio, on the 150th anniversary of the first recorded baseball game between organized teams. The league uses the National Association of Base Ball Players as a model. Rules, equipment, uniforms, behavior, and facilities are all intended to conform with those of the earliest version of the sport.

Purpose
According to the league's mission statement, its purpose is to:

 Preserve, perpetuate, and promote the game of base ball as it was played during its formative years.
 Present the game of base ball using rules, equipment, uniforms, field specifications, customs, practices, language, and behavioral norms of the period.
 Support the growth of vintage base ball clubs.
 Encourage research and disseminate information in order to recreate the game as authentically as possible.
 Educate the public regarding the character, history, and growth of the game.
 Promote the sportsmanship, gentlemanly behavior, courtesy, and respect for others that characterized the early game.

See also
 Vintage Base Ball Federation

External links
Columbus Capitals Base Ball Club
Vintage Base Ball Association Official Website
Vintage Base Ball Article on Yahoo!

Baseball organizations